JD Jackson is an American audiobook narrator, actor, and theater professor. For audiobook narration he won 26 Earphone Awards and 1 Audie Award. In 2020, AudioFile named him a Golden Voice Narrator. In 2022, Booklist named him a Voice of Choice Narrator.

Biography 
Jackson received a Bachelor of Arts in Drama and Speech Communications from Dillard University in 1997. In 2000, he received a Master of Fine Arts in Theater Performance from Temple University.

Awards and honors

Awards

Honors 
In 2020, AudioFile inducted Jackson into their Golden Voice Hall of Fame.

He also narrated two Pulitzer Prize-winning audiobooks, The Tradition by Jericho Brown and The Nickel Boys by Colson Whitehead, as well as Carnegie Medal winner, A Little Devil in America: Notes in Praise of Black Performance by Hanif Abdurraqib.

Filmography

References 

Temple University alumni
Dillard University alumni
21st-century American actors
Audiobook narrators
Year of birth missing (living people)
Living people